Spruce Head is an unincorporated village in Knox County, Maine, United States. Spruce Head has a post office with ZIP code 04859, which opened on March 4, 1880.
Spruce Head was the boyhood home of poet and Connecticut Governor  Wilbert Snow,  who was born on Whitehead Island and is buried in the Ocean View Cemetery at Spruce Head.

The village of Spruce Head lies partly in the township of South Thomaston and partly in the township of  St. George and is connected by a bridge to Sprucehead Island, which is entirely within the borders of South Thomaston. The village centers on the post office, Spruce Head Community Church, and the Spruce Head Community Hall (founded 1922). The island is home to an active lobster fishing fleet and several lobster wholesalers. An additional hamlet considered part of Spruce Head is found along Clark Island Road on the western shore of Wheeler Bay and lies within the township of St. George. It affords access to the Clark Island Preserve, a part of the Maine Coast Heritage Trust.

References

Villages in Knox County, Maine
Villages in Maine